Kleshas (kilesa;  nyon mongs), in Buddhism, are mental states that cloud the mind and manifest in unwholesome actions. Kleshas include states of mind such as anxiety, fear, anger, jealousy, desire, depression, etc. Contemporary translators use a variety of English words to translate the term kleshas, such as: afflictions, defilements, destructive emotions, disturbing emotions, negative emotions, mind poisons, neurosis etc.

In the contemporary Mahayana and Theravada Buddhist traditions, the three kleshas of ignorance, attachment, and aversion are identified as the root or source of all other kleshas. These are referred to as the three poisons in the Mahayana tradition, or as the three unwholesome roots in the Theravada tradition.

While the early Buddhist texts of the Pali canon do not specifically enumerate the three root kleshas, over time the three poisons (and the kleshas generally) came to be seen as the very roots of samsaric existence.

Pali literature 

In the Pali Canon's discourses (sutta), kilesa is often associated with the various passions that defile bodily and mental states.  In the Pali Canon's Abhidhamma and post-canonical Pali literature, ten defilements are identified, the first three of which – greed, hate, delusion – are considered to be the "roots" of suffering.

Sutta Piṭaka: mental hindrances 
In the Pali Canon's Sutta Piṭaka, kilesa and its correlate upakkilesa are affective obstacles to the pursuit of direct knowledge (abhijñā) and wisdom (pañña).

For instance, the Samyutta Nikaya includes a collection of ten discourses (SN 27, Kilesa-sayutta) that state that any association of "desire-passion" (chanda-rāgo) with the body or mind is a "defilement of mind" (cittasse'so upakkileso):
"Monks, any desire-passion with regard to the eye is a defilement of the mind. Any desire-passion with regard to the ear... the nose... the tongue... the body... the intellect is a defilement of the mind. When, with regard to these six bases, the defilements of awareness are abandoned, then the mind is inclined to renunciation. The mind fostered by renunciation feels malleable for the direct knowing of those qualities worth realizing."

More broadly, the five hindrances – sensual desire (kāmacchanda), anger (byāpāda), sloth-torpor (thīna-middha), restlessness-worry (uddhacca-kukkucca), and doubt (vicikicchā) – are frequently associated with kilesa in the following (or a similar) manner:

Additionally, in the Khuddaka Nikaya's Niddesa, kilesa is identified as a component of or synonymous with craving and lust (rāga).

Abhidhamma: ten defilements and unwholesome roots 
While the Sutta Pitaka does not offer a list of kilesa, the Abhidhamma Pitaka's Dhammasangani (Dhs. 1229ff.) and Vibhanga (Vbh. XII) as well as in the post-canonical Visuddhimagga (Vsm. XXII 49, 65) enumerate ten defilements (dasa kilesa-vatthūni) as follows:
 greed (lobha)
 hate (dosa)
 delusion (moha)
 conceit (māna)
 wrong views (micchāditthi)
 doubt (vicikicchā)
 torpor (thīna)
 restlessness (uddhacca)
 shamelessness (ahirika)
 recklessness (anottappa)

The Vibhanga also includes an eightfold list (aha kilesa-vatthūni) composed of the first eight of the above ten.

Throughout Pali literature, the first three kilesa in the above tenfold Abhidhamma list (lobha dosa moha) are known as the "unwholesome roots" (akusala-mūla or the root of akusala); and, their opposites (alobha adosa amoha) are the three "wholesome roots" (kusala-mūla or the root of kusala).  The presence of such a wholesome or unwholesome root during a mental, verbal or bodily action conditions future states of consciousness and associated mental factors (see Karma).

Visuddhimagga: round of defilements 

In the 5th-century CE commentarial Visuddhimagga, in its discussion of "Dependent Origination" (Pali: paticca-samuppada) (Vsm. XVII), it presents different expository methods for understanding this teaching's twelve factors (nidana).  One method (Vsm. XVII, 298) divides the twelve factors into three "rounds" (vaa):
 the "round of defilements" (kilesa-vaa)
 the "round of kamma" (kamma-vaa)
 the "round of results" (vipāka-vaa).
In this framework (see Figure to the right, starting from the bottom of the Figure), kilesa ("ignorance") conditions kamma ("formations") which conditions results ("consciousness" through "feelings") which in turn condition kilesa ("craving" and "clinging") which condition kamma ("becoming") and so on. Buddhaghosa (Vsm. XVII, 298) concludes:
So this Wheel of Becoming, having a triple round with these three rounds, should be understood to spin, revolving again and again, forever; for the conditions are not cut off as long as the round of defilements is not cut off.
As can be seen, in this framework, the round of defilements consists of:
 ignorance (avijjā)
 craving
 clinging (ūpādānā).

Elsewhere in the Visuddhimagga (Vsm. XXII, 88), in the context of the four noble persons (ariya-puggala, see Four stages of enlightenment), the text refers to a precursor to the attainment of nibbana as being the complete eradication of "the defilements that are the root of the round" (vaa-mūla-kilesā).

Sanskrit Sravaka and Mahayana literature

Three poisons 

The three kleshas of ignorance, attachment and aversion are referred to as the three poisons (Skt. triviṣa)  in the Mahayana tradition and as the three unwholesome roots (Pāli, akusala-mūla; Skt. akuśala-mūla )  in the Therevada tradition. These three poisons (or unwholesome roots) are considered to be the root of all the other kleshas.

Five poisons 
In the Mahayana tradition, the five main kleshas are referred to as the five poisons.

The five poisons consist of the three poisons with two additional poisons: pride and jealousy. The five poisons are:

Six root kleshas of the Abhidharma 
The Abhidharma-kośa identifies six root kleshas (mūlakleśa):
 Attachment (raga)
 Anger (pratigha)
 Ignorance (avidya)
 Pride/Conceit (māna)
 Doubt (vicikitsa)
 Wrong view/False view/Opinionatedness (dṛiṣṭi)

In the context of the Yogācāra school of Buddhism, Muller (2004: p. 207) states that the Six Klesha arise due to the "...reification of an 'imagined self'".

Mahaparinirvana Sutra 
The Mahayana Mahaparinirvana Sutra lists approximately 50 kleshas, including those of attachment, aversion, stupidity, jealousy, pride, heedlessness, haughtiness, ill-will, quarrelsomeness, wrong livelihood, deceit, consorting with immoral friends, attachment to pleasure, to sleep, to eating, and to yawning; delighting in excessive talking and uttering lies, as well as thoughts of harm.

Two obscurations 
Mahayana literature often features an enumeration of "two obscurations" (Wylie: sgrib gnyis), the "obscuration of conflicting emotions" (Sanskrit: kleśa-avaraṇa, Wylie: nyon-mongs-pa'i sgrib-ma) and the "obscuration concerning the knowable" (Sanskrit: jñeya-avaraṇa, Wylie: shes-bya'i sgrib-ma).

Contemporary glosses 
Contemporary translators have used many different English words to translate the term kleshas, such as: afflictions, passions, destructive emotions, disturbing emotions, etc.

The following table provides brief descriptions of the term kleshas given by various contemporary Buddhist teachers and scholars:

Overcoming the kleshas 
All Buddhist schools teach that through Tranquility (Samatha) meditation the kilesas are pacified, though not eradicated, and through Insight (Vipassana) the true nature of the kilesas and the mind itself is understood.  When the empty nature of the Self and the Mind is fully understood, there is no longer a root for the disturbing emotions to be attached to, and the disturbing emotions lose their power to distract the mind.

Alternate translations 
The term kleshas has been translated into English as:
 Afflictions
 Mental afflictions
 Mental disturbances
 Afflictive emotions
 Conditioning factors
 Destructive emotions
 Defiled emotions
 Defilements
 Dissonant emotions
 Disturbing emotions
 Disturbing emotions and attitudes
 Negative emotions
 Dissonant mental states
 Kleshas
 Passions
 Poisons
 Mind poisons
 Worldly desires

See also 

 Āsava
 Five hindrances
 Mental factors (Buddhism)
 Ten fetters (Buddhism)
 Three poisons (Buddhism)
 Bhavacakra
 Maya (illusion)
 Buddhism and psychology

 Kleshas (Hinduism)
 Six Enemies (Hinduism)
 Five Thieves (Sikhism)
 Kashaya (Jainism)
 Seven deadly sins

References

Sources 
 Bodhi, Bhikkhu (trans.) (2000). The Connected Discourses of the Buddha: A Translation of the Samyutta Nikaya. Boston: Wisdom Publications. .
 Bodhi, Bhikkhu (2005). In the Buddha's Words. Boston: Wisdom Publications. .
 Dictionary of Buddhism. Oxford University Press, 2003, 2004. Source: http://www.answers.com/topic/kle-a (accessed: January 5, 2008).
 Dzongsar Jamyang Khyentse (2011). What Makes You Not a Buddhist. Kindle Edition. Shambhala
 Epstein, Mark (2009). Going on Being: Buddhism and the Way of Change, a Positive Psychology for the West. Wisdom.
 Goldstein, Joseph. The Emerging Western Buddhism: An Interview with Joseph Goldstein. Insight Meditation Society website.
 Goleman, Daniel (2008). Destructive Emotions: A Scientific Dialogue with the Dalai Lama. Bantam. Kindle Edition.
 Guenther, Herbert V. &  Leslie S. Kawamura (1975), Mind in Buddhist Psychology: A Translation of Ye-shes rgyal-mtshan's "The Necklace of Clear Understanding" Dharma Publishing. Kindle Edition.
 Khenchen Konchog Gyaltshen (2009). A Complete Guide to the Buddhist Path. Snow Lion.
 Longchen Yeshe Dorje (Kangyur Rinpoche) (2010). Treasury of Precious Qualities. Revised edition. Paperback. Shambhala.
 Muller, Charles (2004). The Yogācāra Two Hindrances and Their Reinterpretations in East Asia. Toyo Gakuen University. Source: http://www.acmuller.net/articles/reinterpretations_of_the_hindrances.html (accessed: January 5, 2008)
 Ñāamoli, Bhikkhu (trans.) (1991), The Path of Purification: Visuddhimagga. Seattle: BPS Pariyatti. .
 Nyanatiloka Mahathera (1988). Buddhist Dictionary. Kandy: Buddhist Publication Society. An on-line search engine is available from "BuddhaSasana" at http://www.buddhanet.net/budsas/ebud/bud-dict/dic_idx.htm.
 Padmakara Translation Group (translator) (1998). The Words of My Perfect Teacher, by Patrul Rinpoche. Altamira.
 Patañjali (undated; author); Gabriel Pradīpaka & Andrés Muni (translators) (2007). Yogasūtra.  Source: https://web.archive.org/web/20071222115211/http://www.sanskrit-sanscrito.com.ar/english/sanskrit_pronunciation/pronunciation7.html (accessed: November 23, 2007).
 Rhys Davids, T.W. & William Stede (eds.) (1921-5). The Pali Text Society’s Pali–English Dictionary. Chipstead: Pali Text Society. An on-line search engine is available from "U. Chicago" at http://dsal.uchicago.edu/dictionaries/pali/.
 Thanissaro Bhikkhu (trans.) (1994). Upakkilesa Samyutta: Defilements (SN 27.1-10). Retrieved 2008-02-10 from "Access to Insight" at http://www.accesstoinsight.org/tipitaka/sn/sn27/sn27.001-010.than.html.
 Thanissaro Bhikkhu (trans.) (2004). Ariyapariyesana Sutta: The Noble Search (MN 26). Retrieved 2010-03-20 from "Access to Insight" at http://www.accesstoinsight.org/tipitaka/mn/mn.026.than.html.
 Yongey Mingyur Rinpoche (2007). The Joy of Living. Kindle Edition. Harmony.

External links 

 The Demons of Defilement: (Kilesa Mara), by Ajaan Lee Dhammadharo
 List of ten kilesa (palikanon.com)
 Kilesa, practical synopsis
 ABHIDHAMMA IN DAILY LIFE by Janakabhivamsa, Ashin – Chapter 2: Akusala Cetasikas (Unwholesome mental factors)
 Mind and Life Institute Conference VIII (2000) on Destructive Emotions
 How to Cure 'Destructive Emotions' – an interview with Daniel Goleman

Buddhist philosophical concepts
Unwholesome factors in Buddhism